Alsenborn is a village forming part of the municipality of Enkenbach-Alsenborn within the district of Kaiserslautern in the German state of Rhineland-Palatinate. It has a population of 2,750. Until 1969 Alsenborn was an independent parish before merging with Enkenbach under the administrative reforms in the state. Alsenborn is known country-wide for its circus troupes, the football team of SV Alsenborn, which competed for promotion to the premier league in 1970, and as the home town of Fritz Walter, the 1954 captain of the German Football Team and World Cup champions.

Geography and Geology 
Alsenborn lies 12 kilometres northeast of the city of Kaiserslautern, by the Stumpfwald, a part of the Palatine Forest.

Alsenborn developed as a Haufendorf within the Alsenborn Basin and has grown westwards to merge with the neighbouring village of Enkenbach. Its residential areas have developed predominantly along the road through the valley.

References

Literature

External links 

 Geschichte und Kultur

Former municipalities in Rhineland-Palatinate
Palatinate Forest